Zey (formerly İndere) is a village in the Adıyaman District, Adıyaman Province, Turkey. The village is populated by Turks and had a population of 647 in 2021.

The tomb of Şeyh Abdurrahman Erzincani is located in the village.

The hamlet of Maltepe is attached to Zey.

References

Villages in Adıyaman District